Snekkersten station is a railway station serving the district of Snekkersten in the southern outskirts of the city of Helsingør, Denmark.

It is located on the Coast Line between Helsingør and Copenhagen and the Little North Line between Helsingør and Hillerød. The train services on the Coast Line are currently operated by the railway company DSB Øresund, whereas the railway company Lokaltog runs frequent local train services between Helsingør station and Hillerød station.

History
Snekkersten station is not one of the original stations on the North Line which opened in 1864. The tracks were then located a little further to the west. In 1879, a halt was made near Borupgaard, a local farm. Traffic grew significantly when the Coast Line opened in 1897. The station was refurbished by Sigurd Christensen in 1954.

See also
List of railway stations in Denmark

References

External links

DSB Øresunds website
Lokaltog

Railway stations in the Capital Region of Denmark
Buildings and structures in Helsingør Municipality
Railway stations opened in 1891
Railway stations in the Øresund Region
Railway stations in Denmark opened in the 19th century